Al-Khatib is a surname. People with the surname include:

Surname
 Abdelkrim al-Khatib (1921–2008), Moroccan surgeon, politician and activist
 Ahmad al-Khatib (1933–1982), Syrian politician
 Basil Al-Khatib (born 1962), Syrian director
 Bassam Al-Khatib (born 1975), Jordanian professional footballer
 Firas Al-Khatib (born 1983), Syrian footballer
 Ibtihal Al-Khatib (born 1972), Kuwaiti academic, journalist, and activist
 Ibn al-Khatib (1313–1374), Arab historical figure
 Iyad Mohammad al-Khatib, Syrian politician
 Mahmoud El Khatib (born 1954), Egyptian retired footballer
 Muhammad Mukhtar Al-Khatib (born 1942), Sudanese communist
 Muhammad Nabil Al Khatib, Syrian politician
 Muhib Al Din Al Khatib (1886–1969), Syrian journalist and politician
 Ruhi al-Khatib (1914–1994), Mayor of Jerusalem
 Zaki al-Khatib (1887–1961), Syrian politician
 Ziad Al-Khatib (born 1990), Qatari footballer of Palestinian origins

See also
 Khatib

Surnames
Surnames of Arabic origin
Arabic-language surnames
Surnames of Jordanian origin
Surnames of Moroccan origin
Surnames of Syrian origin
Surnames of Egyptian origin